Alphonso Carreker (born May 25, 1962) is a former American football defensive end who played seven seasons in the National Football League for the Green Bay Packers and Denver Broncos.

Biography 
Carreker was born in Columbus, Ohio, he attended Marion-Franklin High School before playing college football at Florida State University. He was selected in the first round of the 1984 NFL Draft (12th overall) by the Green Bay Packers. Carreker started in Super Bowl XXIV for the Denver Broncos, recording 1 sack and 1 tackle in a loss to the San Francisco 49ers.

Carreker retired after the 1991 season after a 7 year NFL career, having played in 94 games, with 80 as a starter.

References

1962 births
Living people
Players of American football from Columbus, Ohio
American football defensive ends
Florida State Seminoles football players
Green Bay Packers players
Denver Broncos players